Anulidentaliidae is a family of molluscs belonging to the order Dentaliida.

Genera:
 Anulidentalium Chistikov, 1975
 Epirhabdoides Steiner, 1999

References

Molluscs